Jean-Pierre Frisch (7 May 1908 – 4 August 1995) was a Luxembourgian footballer. He competed in the men's tournament at the 1936 Summer Olympics.

References

External links
 
 

1908 births
1995 deaths
Luxembourgian footballers
Luxembourg international footballers
Olympic footballers of Luxembourg
Footballers at the 1936 Summer Olympics
Sportspeople from Esch-sur-Alzette
Association football defenders